Elaeocarpus bancroftii, commonly known as Kuranda quandong, Johnstone River almond, ebony heart, grey nut, or nut tree is a large rainforest tree in the family Elaeocarpaceae which is endemic to Queensland. It has coriaceous (thick but flexible) leaves, attractive white flowers and relatively large fruit containing an edible kernel.

Description

It has scaly brown bark on the trunk and dense foliage.

The rather stiff leaves are ovate to ovate-lanceolate in overall shape and have entire to crenate margins. On the upper surface they are dark green and glabrous with the midrib slightly raised and secondary veins apparent, while the underside is dull green with both the midrib and secondary venation distinctly raised and the tertiary veins feint. The leaf tip is acute to obtuse, and the base is cuneate, i.e. tapering into the petiole or leaf-stem. Like many other species of Elaeocarpus, the leaves turn bright red before falling.

The inflorescences are axillary or ramiflorous umbels produced towards the ends of the twigs and carry a small number (less than 10) of individual flowers. The peduncle and pedicels (stems of the inflorescence and individual flowers, respectively) are velvety.

The flowers are tetramerous (i.e. having four sepals and petals). There are between 45 and 50 stamens in each. Flowering occurs from March to June.

The stone is shaped like a Rugby ball and has four segments (again like the rugby ball) that are clearly evident but difficult to separate. The outer surface of the stone is generally smooth but punctate (i.e. marked with numerous small pits). Within the stone is a solitary elongated seed.

Taxonomy
E. bancroftii was first formally described in 1886 by the German-born botanist Ferdinand von Mueller, in consultation with Frederick Manson Bailey, and published in Proceedings of the Royal Society of Queensland. His description was based on plant specimens collected on the Johnstone River by Thomas Lane Bancroft.

Etymology
The genus name Elaeocarpus is derived from the Greek words ελιά (eliá) meaning "olive", and κᾰρπός (karpós) meaning "fruit". It refers to the superficial similarity of the fruits of the two taxa. The species epithet is in honour of the collector.

Distribution and habitat
This species is endemic to north-eastern Queensland, where it is widespread and grows in well-developed rainforest. It is found in most parts of the Wet Tropics of Queensland World Heritage Area.

Ecology
Fruits are eaten by cassowaries (Casuarius casuarius) and Spectacled flying foxes (Pteropus conspicillatus).  Both of these species help to disperse the seeds, but by very different methods. While the cassowary will easily swallow the fruit and pass the stone out in its droppings, the fruit is too large for the flying fox to swallow. Instead, it will typically pluck the fruit from a tree and fly with it to another location where it will discard the stone after eating the flesh.

The seeds within the stone are eaten by native rats, notably the giant white-tailed rat (Uromys caudimaculatus) which, due to its size and formidable incisors, is able to gnaw through the hardened endocarp to access the seed.

Conservation status
This species has been assessed as least concern by both the Queensland Government under the Nature Conservation Act 1992, and by the IUCN.

Uses

Indigenous uses
Indigenous Australians ate the seeds, although the very hard shell required them to use stones to crack them open. These special "nut stones", which had a groove or hollow in which the nut was placed, along with the accompanying "hammer stones", have been found throughout Queensland as forests were cleared during the expansion of European settlement.

Use in food
The 1889 book 'The Useful Native Plants of Australia' records that "The cotyledons or 'kernels' have a good flavour, and are eaten by the settlers. Other species of Elaeocarpus have fruits which are more or less useful in this respect. Johnstone River, Queensland."

Use in horticulture
Elaeocarpus bancroftii is considered to have good horticultural potential, particularly for parks and larger areas, because of the attractive foliage, showy flowers and interesting fruit, however there is little evidence that Australian local governments have adopted the idea. It can be purchased from many plant nurseries and native plant specialists in Australia.

Gallery

See also
 List of Elaeocarpus species

References

Notes

External links
 
 
 Biography of Thomas Lane Bancroft at the Australian National Botanic Gardens website
 View a map of recorded sightings of Elaeocarpus bancroftii at the Australasian Virtual Herbarium
 See images of Elaeocarpus bancroftii on Flickriver

Oxalidales of Australia
Trees of Australia
bancroftii
Flora of Queensland
Plants described in 1886
Taxa named by Ferdinand von Mueller
Taxa named by Frederick Manson Bailey
Endemic flora of Australia